The 1987–88 Copa México is the 60th staging of the Copa México, but the 33rd staging in the professional era. This cup tournament was played again after 12 years without play.

The competition started on January 29, 1988, and concluded on June 8, 1988, with the final, held at the Estadio Cuauhtémoc in Puebla City, in which Puebla lifted the trophy for the third time ever with an away goal victory over Cruz Azul.

For this edition was played by 16 teams in a knock-out stage.

Knock-out rounds

Semifinals

First Leg

Second Leg

Puebla goes to the final 4–3 on aggregate

Cruz Azul goes to the final 4-2 on aggregate

Finals

First Leg

Second leg

Puebla won the Cup on away goal

References
 Mexico - Statistics of Copa México in season 1987/1988. (RSSSF)

Copa MX
Cop
1987–88 domestic association football cups